Julio Fernández may refer to:
Júlio "Foca" Fernandez Brazilian jiu-jitsu champion and instructor
Julio Ángel Fernández (born 1946), Uruguayan astronomer who hypothesised the existence of what became known as the Kuiper belt
Julio M. Fernandez (born 1954), Chilean Professor in the Department of Biological Sciences at Columbia University, New York, USA
Julio Fernández (musician) (born 1954), guitarist of jazz fusion/smooth jazz group Spyro Gyra
Julio Fernández (film producer), co-founder of the Fantastic Factory film studio